Vogue India is the Indian edition of the monthly fashion and lifestyle magazine Vogue. It is the 17th international edition of Vogue and the first edition in South Asia. Vogue India is published by Condé Nast India Pvt. Ltd., a 100% owned subsidiary of Condé Nast International. Vogue India was the first magazine released in India that is 100% foreign owned. Condé Nast India is based in Mumbai and also has an office in New Delhi.

History

The magazine was founded in 2007. The first issue of Vogue India was the October 2007 issue, which was released on 20 September 2007. The cover was shot by photographer Patrick Demarchelier, and featured Bipasha Basu, Gemma Ward and Priyanka Chopra on the regular cover, and Monikangana Dutta, Preity Zinta, and Lakshmi Menon on the gatefold cover. Ward's appearance on the cover was criticized by some readers who felt that the inaugural edition's cover should have exclusively featured Indian women. Alex Kuruvilla, managing director of Condé Nast India, described Vogue India as being "nosier and more colourful and more vibrant than the western models".

Priya Tanna was the editor-in-chief of Vogue India from 2007 to 2021. The editorial team of Vogue India, and all other Asia-Pacific editions, originally reported to Vogue Taiwan editor Leslie Sun, who in turn reported to global editorial director Anna Wintour. In 2021, Condé Nast announced a global restructuring of its operations to reduce costs. Under the new organization, the Vogue India editorial team reports directly to Anna Wintour who is also the chief content officer of Condé Nast. The restructuring led to the exit of several Vogue editors including Tanna. Condé Nast appointed Megha Kapoor as Head of Editorial Content of Vogue India on 3 September 2021.

Cover models

Notable covers
In the June 2019 magazine issue, Kareena Kapoor, Karan Johar, Diljit Dosanjh and Natasha Poonawalla were seen together having a photoshoot for Vogue India magazine and the magazine issue was named 'Forces of Fashion'. On the cover page, Kareena Kapoor and Karan Johar flaunting their animal print dress and a printed jacket, while Diljit Dosanjh and Natasha Poonawala are wearing purple and yellow outfits.

References

External links
 

2007 establishments in India
Condé Nast magazines
English-language magazines published in India
Monthly magazines published in India
Women's magazines published in India
Magazines established in 2007
Mass media in Mumbai
Women's fashion magazines
India